Nikolai Põdramägi (born 7 January 1944) is an Estonian politician and surgeon. He was a member of XI Riigikogu, representing the Estonian Centre Party.

Nikolai Põdramägi was born in Saabolda. He graduated from Värska Secondary School in 1963 and Tartu State University in 1976. He is a lecturer at the Surgery Clinic of the University of Tartu Hospital and a vascular surgeon.

References

Living people
1944 births
Estonian surgeons
Estonian Centre Party politicians
Members of the Riigikogu, 2007–2011
University of Tartu alumni
Academic staff of the University of Tartu
People from Setomaa Parish